Woert, or Wört, is a municipality in Germany.

Woert, van Woert, or variation, may also refer to:

 Van Woert's Regiment of Militia, the 16th Albany County Militia Regiment, of the U.S. Revolutionary War of Independence
 Chris Woerts (born 1959) Dutch businessman
 Nick van Woert, U.S. artist

See also
 Wort (disambiguation)